Magic words are often nonsense phrases used in fantasy fiction or by stage magicians. 

Magic word or Magic words may also refer to:

Computing
In MediaWiki, a system that makes make system information, such as the current time, available to templates and editors
Hexspeak, hexadecimal "words" used in byte code to identify a specific file or data format are known as magic numbers
Magic string, an input that a programmer believes will never come externally and which activates otherwise hidden functionality
Xyzzy (computing), the first magic word encountered in Colossal Cave Adventure and often used as a meta-syntactic variable

Other uses
Kotodama, the Japanese belief that mystical powers dwell in words and names, sometimes translated as "magic words" in English
Magical formula, words or formulae used in ceremonial magic
Magic words (baseball), words that will likely see a player ejected from the game if directed at an umpire
Magic words (politics), words or phrases as illustrative of speech that qualified as "express advocacy" in relation to United States politics
"Please" and "thank you", often referred to as the magic word or magic words when teaching children manners, see Etiquette

See also
Alan Moore's Magic Words, comics adaptations of four songs by Alan Moore
Incantation, a magical formula intended to trigger a magical effect on a person or objects
Mantra, a sacred word, words or syllables in Sanskrit, Pali and other languages